The 2021–22 LIU Sharks men's ice hockey season was the 2nd season of play for the program. The Sharks represented Long Island University and were coached by Brett Riley, in his 2nd season.

Season
After the COVID-19 pandemic curtailed the program's first season, LIU was able to pay its first full campaign in 2022. Partly due to the recent addition of the team to the Division I ranks, Long Island scheduled several games against Division II teams during the season. While none of these games helped the Sharks in improving their standing (only games against D-I teams are included in PairWise rankings), they won each match comfortably. Against their contemporaries, the Sharks were less successful but the team did show some flashes of potential throughout the year.

During the first half of the season, LIU played 14 games against D-I opponents and the team won once against lowly Miami. While this was hardly surprising as the team was just two years old, the Sharks compounded their difficulty by scheduling many ranked opponents, several of whom would make the NCAA tournament. The schedule didn't get much easier in the second half but LIU was able to earn a season split with fellow independent Alaska to give some heft to their win total.

Departures

Recruiting

Roster
As of September 21, 2021.

|}

Standings

Schedule and results

|-
!colspan=12 style=";" | Regular Season

Scoring statistics

Goaltending statistics

Rankings

Note: USCHO did not release a poll in week 24.

References

2021-22
LIU Sharks
LIU Sharks
2021 in sports in New York (state)
2022 in sports in New York (state)